This is a list of records and statistics of the FIFA Beach Soccer World Cup, including the Beach Soccer World Cup events held before FIFA sanctioning in 2005.

Debut of national teams

Overall team records (2005-present)
In this ranking 3 points are awarded for a win in normal time, 2 points for a win in extra time, 1 point is awarded for a win in penalty shoot-out and 0 for a loss. Teams are ranked by total points, then by goal difference, then by goals scored. Only the points from the 2005 tournament onward are counted.

Overall team records (total)
In this ranking 3 points are awarded for a win in normal time, 2 points for a win in extra time, 1 point is awarded for a win in penalty shoot-out and 0 for a loss. Teams are ranked by total points, then by goal difference, then by goals scored.

The following table shows the overall statistics of all 21 world cups, combining the results of both the Beach Soccer World Cup era and the FIFA Beach Soccer World Cup era.

Medal table

Comprehensive team results by tournament

Legend 
 — Champions
 — Runners-up
 — Third place
 — Fourth place
QF — Quarterfinals (1999–2001, 2004–present)
R1 — Round 1
q — Qualified for upcoming tournament
 — Qualified but withdrew (2005–)
 — Did not participate (1995–2004), Did not qualify (2005–)
 — Did not enter (2005–)
 — Hosts

For each tournament, the number of teams in each finals tournament (in brackets) are shown.

Awards
The following documents the winners of the awards presented at the conclusion of the tournament. Eight awards are currently presented.

Golden Ball
The adidas Golden Ball award is awarded to the player who plays the most outstanding football during the tournament. It is selected by the media poll.

Golden Shoe
The adidas Golden Shoe is awarded to the top scorer of the tournament. If more than one player are equal by the same goals, the players will be selected based on the most assists during the tournament.

Golden Glove
The Golden Glove Award is awarded to the best goalkeeper of the tournament.

FIFA Fair Play Award
The FIFA Fair Play Award is given to the team who has the best fair play record during the tournament with the criteria set by FIFA Fair Play Committee.

Top goalscorers

From the data available the table below lists the all-time top 30 goalscorers, totalling goals scored by players across both world cup iterations.

See also
FIFA World Cup records and statistics

Notes

References

External links
 at FIFA.cpm

FIFA Beach Soccer World Cup